Summerhill is a borough in Cambria County, Pennsylvania, United States. The population was 490 at the 2010 census.

History
Summerhill, a small borough in the Allegheny Mountains in southwestern Pennsylvania, was settled in the early 1800s and grew in large part from the Allegheny Portage Railroad and the Pennsylvania Railroad.

The Thomas and Barbara Croyle family was one of the earliest recorded families to settle in the town in 1794. Their family homestead, a two-story stone structure that still stands, served the family as a fortress against Indian attacks. According to some sources, Indians burned the Croyles' cabin and property, causing the family to seek refuge at Fort Bedford. By 1800, Barbara Croyle chose to rebuild their homestead with stone; she limited windows to two sides of the house to keep it stronger if attacked.

The Croyle family built a grist mill, known locally as Croyle's Mill, and a dam on the Little Conemaugh River to operate it. The establishment of the mill was significant enough for the county to notice and fund its first public works project, a dirt road from Ebensburg to Croyle's Mill. The mill operated into the 1900s.

In February 1810, Summerhill Township was devolved from larger Conemaugh Township, one of three original townships established in Cambria County. Originally spelled "Somerhill", the township was likely named for Joseph and David Somers, some of its early, chief landowners.

In the 1820s, Summerhill Township covered a large swath of land in the north-central part of the current county, including present-day Jackson, Munster, Washington, Portage and Blacklick townships. The existing borough took its name from Summerhill Township and was then known as Summer Hill. Records from 1926 indicate the borough's current spelling, Summerhill.

Geography
Summerhill is located in south-central Cambria County at  (40.375424, -78.760623) in the Laurel Highlands of the Allegheny Mountains. The north branch of the Little Conemaugh River and Laurel Run, tributaries of the Conemaugh River, run through the community. Summerhill is bordered on the west by the borough of Ehrenfeld.

U.S. Route 219, a four-lane expressway, runs through the northwestern part of the borough, with access from an interchange with Pennsylvania Route 53 southwest of the borough limits. US 219 leads north  to Ebensburg, the county seat.

Demographics

As of the census of 2000, there were 521 people, 220 households, and 146 families residing in the borough. The population density was 1,647.5 people per square mile (628.6/km2). There were 227 housing units at an average density of 717.8 per square mile (273.9/km2). The racial makeup of the borough was 99.81% White and 0.19% Asian. Hispanic or Latino of any race were 0.58% of the population.

There were 220 households, out of which 27.7% had children under the age of 18 living with them, 55.5% were married couples living together, 10.9% had a female householder with no husband present, and 33.2% were non-families. 32.7% of all households were made up of individuals, and 20.5% had someone living alone who was 65 years of age or older. The average household size was 2.36 and the average family size was 3.00.

In the borough the population was spread out, with 25.7% under the age of 18, 8.3% from 18 to 24, 25.1% from 25 to 44, 20.3% from 45 to 64, and 20.5% who were 65 years of age or older. The median age was 38 years. For every 100 females there were 86.1 males. For every 100 females age 18 and over, there were 76.7 males.

References

Populated places established in 1892
Boroughs in Cambria County, Pennsylvania